The New York City's YMCA Camp is a recreational and educational sleepover camp in Huguenot, New York and belonged to the YMCA of Greater New York.  While the YMCA operates day camps in the five boroughs of New York City, the Huguenot Camp was the only sleepover camp of the YMCA of New York City. The camp was created in 1918. In March 2021, it was announced that the camp was to be closed and sold.

Camp Talcott, Camp McAlister, and Camp Greenkill 
The camp is located in a mostly wooded area encompassing about 1,000 acres in the western part of  Huguenot. It contains three lakes; each lake has its eponymous camp,- Camp Talcott, Camp McAlister, and Camp Greenkill.  While Camp Talcott and McAllister are summer camps, the facilities at Greenkill are winterized. Greenkill is also home to the Mary French Rockefeller Educational Center and has a large gymnasium.

During the summer, the camp is a temporary home for about 1,200 -1,400 young people each season. For the local community, a day camp was created for the summer. In 2010, after the earthquake in Haiti, a group of Haitian children was sent to the camp to recover from the trauma.

Campers are 7–16 years old and most come from NYC.  A majority of campers receive financial aid. Activities include social interactions of camp life and provide opportunities to participate in swimming, canoeing, archery, arts and crafts, field games, hiking, and more. Campers are supported by staff members. During summer, counselors and additional staff may come from many different countries. After the summer, Camps Talcott and McAlister are closed, while Camp Greenkill remains open for meetings and retreats.

Change in Ownership 
After more than a century of operation during which time, by one estimate, more than 100,000 young people experienced camp life, the YMCA of Greater New York announced its decision to sell the property in March 2021, citing overall losses in excess of $100 million due to the corona virus pandemic. The decision came as a surprise to the Camp's Board of Managers who were not consulted. Former campers, staff members and alumni rallied to save the camp.

In August 2021, it was announced that the Wend Collective had bought the camp with the intent to reach out to "the communities that historically attended the camps, the communities in which the camps are located, and the broader youth camp sector" and to continue to serve disadvantaged youth.

References

Orange County, New York
YMCA Summer Camps